"Soulcreek" is a track written by the Kentucky-based Black Stone Cherry and the official fourth single from their 2008 album, Folklore And Superstition. The band was sending Soulcreek to rock radio on September 7.

References

External links
Black Stone Cherry's Official Website
Roadrunner Records
Black Stone Cherry's Myspace
Black Stone Cherry's Official Forum
NME Audio Player

Black Stone Cherry songs
2008 songs
2009 singles
Roadrunner Records singles
Song recordings produced by Bob Marlette
Songs written by Bob Marlette